Wanganella ruedai is a species of sea snail, a marine gastropod mollusk, unassigned in the superfamily Seguenzioidea.

Description

Distribution
This species occurs in the Atlantic Ocean off Mauritania.

References

 Rolán E. & Gubbioli F. (2000). A new species of the genus Wanganella (Mollusca, Skeneidae) from Mauritania. Argonauta 14(2): 5-8

ruedai
Gastropods described in 2000